Maidstone Barracks railway station is one of three railway stations which serve the town of Maidstone in Kent, England. The station and all trains that serve the station are operated by Southeastern.

The station has been unstaffed since September 1989 and the booking office on the -bound platform was subsequently demolished. A PERTIS (permit to travel) passenger-operated self-service ticket machine was installed on the Strood-bound platform in 2007–08.

Services
All services at Maidstone Barracks are operated by Southeastern using  EMUs.

The typical off-peak service in trains per hour is:
 2 tph to 
 2 tph to  via 

On Sundays, the service is reduced to hourly in each direction.

See also
Maidstone East railway station
Maidstone West railway station

References

External links

Railway stations in Kent
DfT Category F1 stations
Former South Eastern Railway (UK) stations
Railway stations in Great Britain opened in 1874
Railway stations served by Southeastern
Buildings and structures in Maidstone